Cannuli is an Italian surname. Notable people with the surname include: 

Catherine Cannuli (born 1986), Australian soccer coach and player
Thomas Cannuli (born 1992), American poker player

Italian-language surnames